Montagny wine is produced in the communes of Montagny-lès-Buxy, Buxy, Saint-Vallerin and Jully-lès-Buxy in the Côte Chalonnaise subregion of Burgundy. The Appellation d'origine contrôlée (AOC) Montagny may be used for white wine with Chardonnay as the main grape variety. There are 49 Premier Cru vineyards within Montagny AOC, but no Grand Cru vineyards exist in this part of Burgundy. The AOC was created in 1936.

Production
In 2008,  of vineyard surface was in production for Montagny at village and Premier Cru level, and 17,015 hectoliter of wine was produced, which corresponds to close to 2.3 million bottles.

Premiers Crus
There are 49 climats within the Montagny AOC classified as Premier Cru vineyards. Their wines are designated Montagny Premier Cru + vineyard name, or as just Montagny Premier Cru, in which case it is possible to blend wine from several Premier Cru vineyards within the AOC.

In 2008,  of the total Givry vineyard surface consisted of Premier Cru vineyards. The annual production of Premier Cru wine, as a five-year average, is 12,078 hectoliter.

The following Premier Cru vineyards are located in the commune of Montagny-lès-Buxy:

The following Premier Cru vineyards are located in the commune of Buxy:

The following Premier Cru vineyards are located in the commune of Saint-Vallerin:

The following Premier Cru vineyards are located in the commune of Jully-lès-Buxy:

References

Burgundy (historical region) AOCs